Henry Chester (died 1855) was an Irish politician.

Living at Cartown, near Drogheda, Chester became a deputy-lieutenant and magistrate of County Louth.  Chester was appointed as High Sheriff of Louth  in 1837, unusually for a Catholic whose name was not put forward by judges.  However, he wished to contest the 1837 UK general election in County Louth as a Whig.  He was permitted to resign as High Sheriff in order to stand, and won the seat.  However, he resigned in 1840 by accepting the Chiltern Hundreds.

References

Year of birth missing
1855 deaths
High Sheriffs of County Louth
Members of the Parliament of the United Kingdom for County Louth constituencies (1801–1922)
People from County Louth
UK MPs 1837–1841
Whig (British political party) MPs for Irish constituencies